Orlovskaya is a rural locality (a village) in Dvinitskoye Rural Settlement, Syamzhensky District, Vologda Oblast, Russia. The population was 34 as of 2002.

Geography 
Orlovskaya is located 58 km northeast of Syamzha (the district's administrative centre) by road. Zakharovskaya is the nearest rural locality.

References 

Rural localities in Syamzhensky District